Michael Paulson is an American journalist.  From 2000 to 2010 he covered religion for The Boston Globe.  Since 2010, he has worked at the New York Times, where he initially continued his religion coverage. His work there reflected his early politics roots and continued to tie religion to national issues. Since April 2015, he has covered theater at the New York Times.

Personal
Paulson is a native of Newton, Massachusetts and now lives in Boston. He graduated from Newton South High School and obtained his degree from Haverford College.

Career
Mr. Paulson was the National Religion reporter for the New York Times.  While working for The Boston Globe, Paulson was responsible for covering the world's faith and spirituality. He began working for The Boston Globe in January 2000. Prior to this, his career included seven years working as a city hall reporter, a state house bureau chief, and as a Washington correspondent at the Seattle Post-Intelligencer. Before that he worked as a political reporter for the San Antonio Light in Texas.In May 2021 Michael received criticism for a piece about Broadway reopening after COVID-19 restrictions.  His article is accused of being fat shaming.

Books
Paulson co-authored the book, "Betrayal: The Crisis in the Catholic Church."

Awards
Paulson won a number of awards which include:
In 2003, he shared in the Pulitzer Prize for his coverage of child abuse affairs in the archdiocese of Boston. He has also won the Mike Berger, Templeton and Supple awards in 2008, and is a four-time winner of the Wilbur Award for his coverage of the Boston archdiocese abuse scandal, the elevation of Episcopal Bishop Gene Robinson, and the death of Pope John Paul II.
The Religion Communicators Council has awarded him its Wilbur Award in 2003, 2004, and 2005.
Associated Press Managing Editors' Freedom of Information Award
Goldsmith Prize for Investigative Reporting
George Polk Award
A medal from Investigative Reporters and Editors
Selden Ring Award
Sigma Delta Chi Award from the Society of Professional Journalists
Taylor Family Award 
Worth Bingham Award 
The New York Times Company's Punch Sulzberger Award
His team also won a media award from the Massachusetts Association and the Spirit Award from Jane Doe Inc.

See also
Catholic sex abuse cases

References

Media coverage of Catholic Church sexual abuse scandals
Living people
Year of birth missing (living people)
Newton South High School alumni
Haverford College alumni
American male journalists